The Law Council of Australia, founded in 1933, is an association of law societies and bar associations from the states and territories of Australia, and the peak body representing the legal profession in Australia. The Law Council represents more than 65,000 lawyers across Australia[] and has its national base in Canberra.

History 
The Law Council was formed in 1933 to unite the various state legal associations to represent the profession at a national level and at an international level.
Dr Gordon Hughes, a former President of the Law Council, has written a book on the Law Council's history titled The Law Council of Australia – the People, the Profession and the Institutions.

List of presidents
List of presidents of the Law Council of Australia:

1933: Herbert Mayo
1934: Richard Clive Teece
1935: John Latham
1936: Francis George Villeneuve Smith
1937: Richard Teece (2nd term)
1938: William Butler
1939: Alec McGill
1940: Reginald Bonney
1941–45: David Maughan
1946: Roy McArthur
1947: Edward Reynolds
1948–49: Robert Vroland
1950–51: Harry Alderman
1952–53: Garfield Barwick
1954–55: Leonard Butts
1956–57: Douglas Menzies
1958–59: Oscar Negus
1960–61: Wilfrid Francis
1962–63: John Bruce Piggott
1964–65: John Kerr
1966–67: Howard Zelling
1968–69: Peter Connolly
1970–71: Thomas Molomby
1972–73: Peter Brinsden
1974–75: Kevin O'Leary
1976–77: David Ferguson
1978: Cedric Thomson
1979: John Carlisle Richards
1980: Peter Cranswick
1981: Donald Mackay
1982: Gerry Murphy
1983: Ian Temby
1984: Cecil Pincus
1984–85: Alan Cornell
1985–86: Michael Gill
1986–87: Daryl Williams
1987–88: John Faulks
1988–89: Denis Byrne
1989–90: Mahla Pearlman
1990–91: Alex Chernov
1991–92: David Miles
1992–93: Robert Meadows
1993–94: John Mansfield
1994–95: Stuart Fowler
1995–96: Michael Phelps
1996–97: Peter Short
1997–98: Bret Walker
1998–99: Fabian Dixon
1999–00: Gordon Hughes
2000–01: Anne Trimmer
2001–02: Tony Abbott
2002–03: Ron Heinrich
2003–04: Bob Gotterson
2004–05: Stephen Southwood
2005–06: John North
2006–07: Tim Bugg
2007–08: Ross Ray
2009: John Corcoran
2010: Glenn Ferguson
2011: Alexander Ward
2012: Catherine Gale
2013: Joseph Catanzariti
2014: Michael Colbran
2015: Duncan McConnel
2016: Stuart Clark
2017: Fiona McLeod
2018: Morry Bailes
2019: Arthur Moses
2020: Pauline Wright

References

External links
 

1933 establishments in Australia
Legal organisations based in Australia
Organizations established in 1933